"Ride for Me" is a song by Canadian DJ A-Trak and producer Falcons. It features American rappers Young Thug and 24hrs. It was released as a single via A-Trak's Fool's Gold Records on February 7, 2018.

Background
Rolling Stone described Thug's vocals as "eclectic, cartoonish and erratic".

References

A-Trak songs
Young Thug songs
2018 songs
2018 singles
Song articles with missing songwriters
Songs written by Ronny J
Songs written by Young Thug